Siege of Navarino may refer to:

Siege of Navarino (1572), between the Ottoman Empire and the Holy League
, which resulted in the Navarino massacre during the Greek War of Independence